Fikret Tuncher Fikret (born 3 March 1995) is a Bulgarian pop-folk singer of Turkish descent. He is the son of singer Toni Storaro.

Biography 
Fiki was born in Shumen, Bulgaria. His father Toni Storaro is a popular Bulgarian singer. He is among the five Bulgarians selected for more than 110-member international choir Voices of Youth Music who participate in the opening of the 2012 Summer Olympics. In the casting he appeared with two songs of Stevie Wonder - "Lately" and "I Just Called to Say I Love You". Bellissimo 

His first own song was a duet with his father Toni Storaro. The song is titled "Kazhi mi kato mazh" ("Tell me like a man") (in Bulgarian "Кажи ми като мъж"). It was composed by Pantelis Pantelidis. In early October 2013, he released another new song - "Koy" (in Bulgarian "Кой") with Galena. Shortly after that, Fiki signed a contract with the company Payner and became a part of the music company. The song won the ranking of "Hit of 2013" by portal signal.bg. and "Duet Song of 2013" at the annual awards of the "Planeta TV"

The first solo song was released on 30 April 2014 titled Beshe Obich (in Bulgarian Беше обич). The title song topped Bulgarian "Planet Top 20" chart in May.  At the beginning of summer 2014 he released the song Stiga (English: Enough) with popular music video director Ludmil Illarionov - Lusi. He embarked on a "Planeta Summer 2014" tour for the first time to promote song. In October 2014 he was featured in a song by Tsvetelina Yaneva titled "Strah Me e" (in Bulgarian "Страх ме е"). In the same month, he released the video for a second duet with Galena called "Boje, Prosti" (in Bulgarian "Боже, прости"). On 24 November 2014 Fiki release a new single "Gore-Dolu" (in Bulgarian "Горе-долу") featuring singer Preslava. The follow up songs for the Christmas and New Year season were "Zaydi, Zaydi" ("Зайди, зайди") and "Yano, mori" ("Яно, мори").

In 2015, he was featured in Kristiana's song Moy Dokray (English: My Drone). On 20 April 2015 he released the ballad song "Dusha" ("Душа") and in early summer that year "Bum" (English: Boom). He was also featured in a song by the Bulgarian singer Andrea in "Sex Za Den" (English: Sex for Day). On 3 July 2015 he collaborated in a duet with Azis in the joint release on the song "Blokiran" ("Блокиран") followed by his own single "Zhelezen" ("Железен") in September 2015.

Fiki was awarded the special prize Fashion Idol during the annual 2015 Ball of the top models, organised by Evgeni Minchev. On 17 November 2015 he released the video for new song "Dzhale, Dzhale" ("Джале, джале"). His last release of 2015 was "S Teb Ili s Nikoy" (С теб или с никой") a Preslava release.

Fiki won Singer of the Year 2015 and Video sensation of the Year awards during the Annual Planeta TV Awards.

In the same year, he released his debut album Is This Love, with three additional songs Ti si mi sarceto (English: You are My Heart), Tuk sam (I'm here) and first English-language song with same name.

In 2017, he released song Ако искаш (English: If You Want), in September Pate (Little Duck).

Personal life 
In the autumn of 2017 Fiki married his girlfriend Guldzhan, also of Turkish descent. They have a son and a daughter.

Discography 
 2016 – Is This Love

Videos / Songs
Solo
"Beshe Obich" ("Беше обич")
"Stiga" ("Стига")
"Dusha" ("Душа")
"Bum" ("Бум")
"Zhelezen" ("Железен")
"Dzhale, Dzhale" ("Джале, джале")
"Vertoleta" ("Вертолета")
"Is This Love"
"Ako iskash" ("Ако искаш")
"Pate" ("Пате")
"Az izmraznah" ("Аз измръзнах")
Collaborations
"Kazhi mi kato mazh" ("Кажи ми като мъж" (Fiki and Toni Storaro)
"Koy" ("Кой") (Galena featuring Fiki)
"Boje, Prosti" ("Боже, прости") (Galena and Fiki)
"Gore-Dolu" ("Горе–долу") (Fiki featuring Preslava)
"Blokiran" ("Блокиран") (Fiki and Azis)
"S Teb Ili s Nikoy" ("С теб или с никой") (Preslava and Fiki)
"S drug me barkash" ("С друг ме бъркаш") (Fiki featuring Galena)
"Izneverish li mi" ("Изневериш ли ми") (Fiki and Galena)
"Po muzhki" ("По мъжки") (Fiki and Haktan)

References

Living people
1995 births
21st-century Bulgarian male singers
Bulgarian folk-pop singers
Fiki
People from Shumen
Payner artists